Javier López Vallejo (born 22 September 1975) is a Spanish retired footballer who played as a goalkeeper.

Club career
Born in Pamplona, López Vallejo began his career at hometown's CA Osasuna, making his first appearance for the main squad not yet 19 in a 3–0 home win over Sporting de Gijón on 15 May 1994, although the Navarrese had already been relegated from La Liga. He became an undisputed starter from the 1995–96 season onwards.

Vallejo signed for Villarreal CF in 1999 alongside teammate Jesús Unanua (also a goalkeeper), appearing in all the games during the 1999–2000 campaign as the club returned to the top flight after a one-year absence. He retained first-choice status the following two years.

With the signing of Pepe Reina in 2002 and the subsequent arrival of imports Sebastián Viera and Mariano Barbosa, however, López Vallejo was consecutively demoted to backup and third-choice. In order to search more playing opportunities he joined fellow league team Recreativo de Huelva on loan for the 2006–07 season, where he played the majority of the Andalusians' matches in that competition.

In 2007–08, Vallejo signed for Real Zaragoza on a free transfer, where he backed up former Real Madrid player César (two games played). As the latter moved to Tottenham Hotspur in August 2008 he became the starter, with the side now playing in the second division, and was instrumental as they immediately returned to the top level.

López Vallejo started the 2009–10 season on the bench, then became first-choice over Juan Pablo Carrizo. However, he lost his position in January 2010 with the arrival of new coach José Aurelio Gay and, during that month, was released by mutual consent; he immediately found a new team, joining Levadiakos F.C. in Greece alongside compatriot Enrique Sola, from former club Osasuna.

Honours

Club
Villarreal
UEFA Intertoto Cup: 2003, 2004

Country
Spain U16
UEFA European Under-16 Championship: 1991

Spain U17
FIFA U-17 World Cup: Runner-up 1991

External links

1975 births
Living people
Footballers from Pamplona
Spanish footballers
Association football goalkeepers
La Liga players
Segunda División players
Segunda División B players
CA Osasuna B players
CA Osasuna players
Villarreal CF players
Recreativo de Huelva players
Real Zaragoza players
Super League Greece players
Levadiakos F.C. players
Kavala F.C. players
Spain youth international footballers
Spain under-21 international footballers
Spain under-23 international footballers
Spanish expatriate footballers
Expatriate footballers in Greece
Spanish expatriate sportspeople in Greece
Basque Country international footballers